Who Wrote the Bible? may refer to:

Who Wrote the Bible?, a 1987 book by biblical scholar Richard Elliott Friedman
 Who Wrote the Bible?, a 1996 two-part episode of the TV series Mysteries of the Bible
Who Wrote the Bible?, a 2004 documentary by theologian Robert Beckford

See also
The documentary hypothesis, a theory regarding the authorship of the Torah/Pentateuch, i.e. the first part of the Old Testament of the Bible
Authorship of the Bible